is a Japanese manga series written by Kōtarō Isaka and illustrated by Megumi Ōsuga, both adapting and serving as a continuation of Isaka's 2004 novel 3 Assassins (Grasshopper), the first novel in his Hitman novel trilogy, and his 2005 short story collection Maō. The series is about a young man who discovered his power and uncovered a rising leader's secret to rule Nekota city. It was serialized in Shogakukan's Weekly Shōnen Sunday from June 2007 to June 2009 and compiled into ten tankōbon volumes. In North America, the series was licensed for English release by Viz Media.

Plot
Andō is a high-school student who possesses the ability to make anyone within a 30-step radius to say whatever he thinks. Inukai is the young chief of the Grass Hopper, a self-defense force who claims to maintain Nekota town's peace. When Andō realises Inukai is using inhumane methods to control the population, he decides to stop Inukai with his ability. However, Andō isn't the only enemy Inukai has, and vice-versa.

Characters
 
 Resident of the fictional Nekota city (based in Kanto region) and a second-year student at Nekota East High. He did not agree with Inukai's way to change the world and fought against his group, the Grasshopper.
 
 The younger brother of Ando.
 
He is the charismatic person who can manipulate many people.
 
 The master of Duce cafe and Inukai's trusted ally. Later revealed to be an ESP user.
 
 An assassin first sent to kill the older Ando, but spared him instead because of his assassination contract being cancelled.
 
 An American influencing businessman and president of the Anderson Group who wants to make his project building the "New City" in Nekota city.
 
 A half-American, half-Japanese student who later attends the same class with the older Ando. Due to Inukai's influences, Nekota residents' rage for the Anderson Group (a company managed by his father) intensely increase which make Anderson's classmates and other students behave violently towards the younger Anderson.
 
 A girl who is a third-year student and president of Nekota High's Newspaper club in which the Ando brothers are members.
 
 Junya's girlfriend.
 
 A boy who is the classmate of the older Ando. He was a bully victim before being contacted with Inukai.
 
 An assassin hired by Mr. Anderson to kill a great number of members of Grasshopper.
 
 The older Ando's friend in Nekota Highschool.
 
 A top-notch assassin and the father of Kentaro and Kojiro.
   
 The twin brothers who can use ESP since their young age.
 
 A dealer who manages Semi's contracts, and is much feared/respected by Semi.

Publication
Maoh: Juvenile Remix, written by Kōtarō Isaka and illustrated by Megumi Ōsuga, is based on Isaka's own novels, 3 Assassins (Grasshopper) and Maō (respectively published by Kodansha in 2004 and 2005). It was serialized in Shogakukan's Weekly Shōnen Sunday from June 6, 2007, to June 24, 2009. Shogakukan collected its chapters into ten tankōbon volumes, released from November 16, 2007, to August 18, 2009.

Viz Media licensed the manga for English release in North America in 2009. The ten volumes were released from May 11, 2010, to April 10, 2012.

A spin-off series, titled Waltz, was serialized in Shogakukan's Monthly Shōnen Sunday from October 10, 2009, to February 10, 2012. Shogakukan collected the chapters in six tankōbon volumes, released from March 12, 2010, to May 11, 2012.

Volume list

References

External links
 Maoh Juvenile Remix at Viz Media
 

Hitman (novel series)
2007 manga
21st-century Japanese novels
Crime in anime and manga
Political thriller anime and manga
Science fiction anime and manga
Shōnen manga
Supernatural thriller anime and manga